"Two Princes" is a song by American rock group Spin Doctors, released in 1992 as the second single from their debut album, Pocket Full of Kryptonite (1991). It peaked at number seven on the US Billboard Hot 100 and number three on the Cash Box Top 100. Outside of the US, it topped the charts in Iceland and Sweden and peaked within the top 10 of the charts in Australia, Canada, Germany, the Netherlands, Ireland, and the United Kingdom. The song earned them a Grammy Award nomination for Best Rock Performance by a Duo or Group.

Critical reception
Stephen Thomas Erlewine from AllMusic complimented "Two Princes" as one of the "best tracks" of the album. Larry Flick from Billboard wrote, "The Doctors' growing legion of fans will devour this treat from Pocket Full of Kryptonite within seconds." He explained further, "Percolating rhythm section, courtesy of Aaron Comess and Mark White, propels Eric Schenkman's scratchy guitars and a pure-pop hook. Engaging vocals by Christopher Barron and lively instrumentation assure instant album-rock and alternative play, with visions of successfully crossing into the pop arena realistically dancing in everyone's heads." Randy Clark from Cash Box commented, "This crunchy rock/funk groove hints of the same raw, unpolished but infectious street quality of the early Rolling Stones except with an unspoiled and urgent alternative style." A reviewer from Kingston Informer viewed the song as "brilliant". 

In his weekly UK chart commentary, James Masterton noted, "Leaping just as dramatically into the Top 10 come the Spin Doctors, almost 18 months after the track was first heard by the American public. It touches a chord with many as well. Marry him or marry me, I'm the one who loves you baby can't you see...." Pan-European magazine Music & Media wrote, "Although the album [...] was released about two years ago, the singles of the medicals are still doing fine. Put your faith in this one too, as the funky guitar rock of this 'royal' track is as infectious as you could wish for." Leesa Daniels from Smash Hits gave it five out of five, saying, "This is their second bash at the UK charts and it's just marvellous. A thumping drum beat with guitars rocking all over the place, it makes you want to jump onto the nearest table and dance and twirl and swing your head around until you eventually, er, pass out!" Troy J. Augusto from Variety named the song one of their "undeniable gems".

"Two Princes" was ranked No. 41 on VH1's "100 Greatest Songs of the '90s"; conversely, it was ranked No. 21 on Blender magazine's "50 Worst Songs Ever".

Music video
The band filmed two different music videos for the song; one of them was in black-and-white. One of the videos was directed by Richard Murray and premiered in February 1992.

Track listings
7-inch, CD, and cassette single
"Two Princes" (album version) – 4:16
"Off My Line" (live) – 5:30

12-inch and maxi-CD single
"Two Princes" (album version) – 4:16
"Off My Line" (live) – 5:30
"Rosetta Stone" (live) – 8:07

Charts

Weekly charts

Year-end charts

All-time charts

Certifications and sales

Release history

See also
List of Billboard Mainstream Top 40 number-one songs of the 1990s
List of number-one singles and albums in Sweden

References

1991 songs
1993 singles
Spin Doctors songs
Number-one singles in Iceland
Number-one singles in Sweden
Black-and-white music videos
Epic Records singles